Eucalyptus macrorhyncha, commonly known as the red stringybark, is a species of medium-sized tree that is endemic to eastern Australia. It has rough, stringy, grey to brown bark, lance-shaped adult leaves, flower buds in groups of between seven and eleven, white flowers and hemispherical fruit.

Description
It has rough, stringy, grey to reddish brown bark on the trunk and branches. Flowering occurs between February and July and the flowers are white.

Near Bundarra and Barraba, this species is difficult to distinguish from E. laevopinea.

Taxonomy and naming
Eucalyptus macrorhyncha was first formally described in 1867 by George Bentham based on specimens collected by Frederick Adamson and by Ferdinand von Mueller who gave the species its name and wrote an unpublished description. The formal description was published in Flora Australiensis.

In 1973, Lawrie Johnson and Donald Blaxell changed the name of Eucalyptus cannonii to E. macrorhyncha subsp. cannonii and the names of the two subspecies are accepted by the Australian Plant Census:
 Eucalyptus macrorhyncha subsp. cannonii (R.T.Baker) L.A.S.Johnson & Blaxell has larger buds and wider fruit with more protruding valves than subspecies macrorhyncha;
 Eucalyptus macrorhyncha F.Muell. ex Benth. subsp. macrorhyncha.

The Wiradjuri people of New South Wales use the name gundhay for the species.

Distribution and habitat
Red stringybark occurs on ranges and tablelands of New South Wales, the Australian Capital Territory and Victoria, with a small, disjunct population in the Spring Gully Conservation Park south-west of Clare in South Australia.

Gallery

References

External links

macrorhyncha
Myrtales of Australia
Flora of the Australian Capital Territory
Flora of New South Wales
Flora of South Australia
Flora of Victoria (Australia)
Taxa named by Ferdinand von Mueller
Taxa named by George Bentham
Plants described in 1867